Roger Federer defeated the defending champion John Isner in the final, 6–1, 6–4 to win the men's singles tennis title at the 2019 Miami Open. It was Federer's fourth Miami Open title, his 28th and final Masters singles title, and his 101st career singles title overall.

Félix Auger-Aliassime became the youngest men's singles semifinalist in the tournament's 35-year history, and the first teenage semifinalist since Andy Murray and Novak Djokovic in 2007. Auger-Aliassime also became the first player born in the 21st century to reach a Masters 1000 semifinal.

Seeds
All seeds received a bye into the second round.

Draw

Finals

Top half

Section 1

Section 2

Section 3

Section 4

Bottom half

Section 5

Section 6

Section 7

Section 8

Qualifying

Seeds

Qualifiers

Lucky losers

Qualifying draw

First qualifier

Second qualifier

Third qualifier

Fourth qualifier

Fifth qualifier

Sixth qualifier

Seventh qualifier

Eighth qualifier

Ninth qualifier

Tenth qualifier

Eleventh qualifier

Twelfth qualifier

References

External links
Main draw
Qualifying draw

Men's Singles
Men in Florida